At the 2010 Asian Games in the Women's doubles tennis event, Zheng Jie and Yan Zi were the defending champions, but only Yan chose to participate, and partnered up with Peng Shuai.
They lost in the semifinals against Chang Kai-chen and Hsieh Su-wei, who lost the final to Latisha Chan and Chuang Chia-jung 7–5, 6–3.

Tie-breaks were used for the first two sets of each match, which was best of three sets. If the score was tied at one set all, a 'super tie-break' (the first pairing to win at least 10 points by a margin of two points) was used.

Schedule
All times are China Standard Time (UTC+08:00)

Results
Legend
r — Retired

Final

Top half

Bottom half

References
Women's doubles - The Official Website of the 16th Asian Games

Women's doubles